Stephen Nagy (May 28, 1919 – July 24, 2016) was an American pitcher in Major League Baseball who played parts of two seasons for the Pittsburgh Pirates in  and the Washington Senators in . Listed at 5' 9", 174 lb., Nagy batted and threw left handed.

Biography
Born in Franklin, New Jersey, Nagy attended Seton Hall University in South Orange, New Jersey. He also had a Minor League career in all or parts of 14 seasons spanning –, being interrupted while serving in the Navy during World War II. Nagy died in 2016 in Poulsbo, Washington, at the age of 97. At the time of his death, he was the seventh oldest living MLB player, as well as the oldest living member of the Pirates and the Senators.

Sources

External links
, or Retrosheet

1919 births
2016 deaths
United States Navy personnel of World War II
Baseball players from New Jersey
Buffalo Bisons (minor league) players
Durham Bulls players
Indianapolis Indians players
Major League Baseball pitchers
Montreal Royals players
People from Franklin, New Jersey
Pittsburgh Pirates players
Sacramento Solons players
San Francisco Seals (baseball) players
Seattle Rainiers players
Seton Hall Pirates baseball players
Sportspeople from Sussex County, New Jersey
Washington Senators (1901–1960) players